Far Far Away is a 2021 Hong Kong romantic comedy film and the third full-length feature written and directed by Amos Why. The film follows a 28-year-old introverted IT geek who is inexperienced in dating, but suddenly finds himself romantically involved with five attractive women at different times, all are living in New Territories or Outlying Islands, Hong Kong.

It premiered as the closing film of the 2021 Hong Kong Asian Film Festival, and screened at the Osaka Asian Film Festival, New York Asian Film Festival, as well as the Far East Film Festival in Udine. It was theatrically released in Hong Kong on 4 August 2022.

Cast
 Kaki Sham as Hau
 Cecilia So as A. Lee, living in Sha Tau Kok
 Rachel Leung as Mena Man, living in Tai O
 Hanna Chan as Lisa, living in Lai Chi Wo
 Jennifer Yu as Melanie, living in Sea Ranch, Lantau Island
 Crystal Cheung as Fleur, living in Pak Nai, Lau Fau Shan
 Will Or as Tai-tung
 Yatho Wong as Jude Law
 Ning Chan as Gigi
 Peter Chan as Manager
 Adam Wong as Colleague Chris
 Manson Cheung as Mena's boyfriend

Awards and nominations

References

External links
 
 

2021 films
2021 romantic comedy films
Hong Kong romantic comedy films
2020s Cantonese-language films